"Vato" is the first single by Snoop Dogg from his album Tha Blue Carpet Treatment. The song features B-Real and was produced by The Neptunes. The word "vato" is Chicano slang for "homie".

Background
The album version of "Vato" contains an introduction with Snoop Dogg saying "Man, don't you know that I'm loco?" and also some shout-outs from Julio G. Shortly after the release of the song, Snoop Dogg and B-Real would receive disses and responses by numerous Mexican rappers who mistakenly took the song as a slander towards the Chicano culture. The song was performed live in the Life & Rhymes of with B-Real, and in solo on the day of the release in the MSN live session concert.

Music video
The music video, directed by Phillip G. Atwell for Vato premiered on BET on August 30, 2006 . Pharrell Williams said the rapper's newest music video 'Vato' would not only feature his gangsta side, but would also tackle the issue of racial conflict in Los Angeles between African-Americans and Hispanics and call for racial unity. It features cameos by Chicano rapper Frost as well as Oscar-Nominee Edward James Olmos. An animated video also premiered on snoopdogg.com in September.

Remixes 
Official
"Vato (DJ Jam Remix)" (featuring Malverde)
"Vato (Remix)" (featuring Lil Uno & B-Real)

Personnel
Written by C. Broadus, P. Williams, C. Hugo
Produced by The Neptunes
Publishers: My Own Chit Publishing/EMI Blackwood Music (BMI); Waters of Nazareth Publishing/ EMI Blackwood Music, Inc. (BMI)/ 
Recorded by Andrew Coleman at Chalice Studios, Los Angeles, California, Chris Jackson at The Cathedral, Hollywood, California
Mixed by Phil Tan in the Tanning Booth at The Record Plant, Los Angeles, California and Soapbox Studios, Atlanta, Georgia
Assisted by Josh Houghkirk Heavy Harmony Music Publishing; WB Music Corp. (ASCAP) and EMI April Music (ASCAP)

Charts

References

External links

Vato
Snoop Dogg songs
Songs written by Chad Hugo
Songs written by Pharrell Williams
Songs written by Snoop Dogg
Song recordings produced by the Neptunes
Gangsta rap songs
Geffen Records singles